Kuldu is a village in Batken Region of Kyrgyzstan. Its population was 5,299 in 2021.

Population

References

Populated places in Batken Region